"Beware of Young Girls" is the seventh episode of the horror black comedy series Scream Queens. It premiered on November 3, 2015 on Fox, after a week hiatus due to the 2015 World Series. The episode was directed by Barbara Brown and written by Ryan Murphy. The episode centers around the Chanels' effort to contact the deceased Chanel #2 (Ariana Grande) using a Ouija board to dig information about the killer, and Dean Munsch (Jamie Lee Curtis) dealing with facing her ex-husband (Philip Casnoff) and his young mistress (Tavi Gevinson).

This episode was watched live by 2.44 million viewers and received negative reviews from critics.

Plot

In the Kappa House, Chanel (Emma Roberts) organizes a funeral for Chanel #2 (Ariana Grande) and delivers a scathing eulogy, as she is still annoyed that Chanel #2 slept with Chanel's boyfriend, Chad (Glen Powell). Concerned for their leader, Chanel #3 (Billie Lourd), Chanel #5 (Abigail Breslin), and Hester/Chanel #6 (Lea Michele) convince Chanel to use a Ouija board to contact Chanel #2 so the two can make up. Via the board, Chanel #2 answers various questions and informs them that Chad is cheating on Chanel again. Chanel visits the frat house to see for herself and finds Chad in bed with a goat. Chad explains that he's lactose intolerant and he keeps the goat for its lactose-free milk. Chanel apologizes, blaming Chanel #2 for doubting him.

At the next séance, the Ouija board claims that Chanel is the Red Devil killer and Hester convinces the others to kill Chanel. At night, Chanel #2's ghost visits Chanel. Chanel #2 explains that she is in Hell and in order for her to make it into Heaven, she must make amends with Chanel. She apologizes for falsely naming Chanel as the killer and warns that her minions are plotting against her. Chanel confronts them and convinces them that Grace (Skyler Samuels) and Zayday (Keke Palmer) are the Red Devil.

Meanwhile, Gigi (Nasim Pedrad) advises Grace and Pete (Diego Boneta) to investigate Feather McCarthy (Tavi Gevinson), a former Wallace University student who had a feud with Dean Cathy Munsch (Jamie Lee Curtis). When they go to meet Feather, Feather reveals that she had an affair with professor Steven Munsch (Philip Casnoff), the ex-husband of Dean Munsch. When Steven announced he was divorcing Dean Munsch, she went ballistic, forcing Steven to temporarily move into the Kappa House. Dean Munsch then stalked Feather, showing up dressed exactly like her.  After the divorce finalized, Steven and Feather moved in together, which further enraged Dean Munsch. She then attempted to murder Feather by pushing a transistor radio into the bathtub while Feather was bathing. Pete asks Feather whether she would be able to go on record as a source on a story about Munsch, to which she willingly agrees.

Later that night, Feather returns home to discover Steven's severed head in a fish tank. Dean Munsch is arrested by Detective Chisolm as the prime suspect. Dean Munsch is also suspected of being behind the other Red Devil murders. Grace and Pete celebrate their victory but Dean Munsch invites them to visit her at the mental hospital where she is incarcerated, promising information on the 1995 "bathtub baby" lead.

When they visit Dean Munsch at the asylum, they find her relatively calm and happy but she insists Feather is Steven's true murderer. After hearing Dean Munsch refuse a lunchmeat sandwich because she is extremely allergic, Peter remembers Steven's murderer made and ate a sandwich at the scene of the crime. They discover it was a bologna sandwich, which means Cathy couldn't have been the killer. They find evidence that points to Feather as Steven's murderer and she is arrested.

An ending sequence shows Cathy dancing to the song "Beware of Young Girls" and her narration reveals that she had in fact killed her ex-husband and she made the bologna sandwich as a cover-up so that Feather would get framed. She decided to take advantage of the Red Devil murders to get revenge on Feather and Steven. Feather is last seen in a mental asylum, insisting on her innocence. Meanwhile, the Chanels ominously observe Grace and Zayday.

Production
Ariana Grande returns as a special guest star, portraying Sonya Herfmann / Chanel #2, the deceased member of the Chanels and Kappa Kappa Tau. Many fans and viewers express disappointment regarding her death in the Series Premiere, and in response, Ryan Murphy tweeted about her return in later episodes. On August 4, 2015, it was announced that Tavi Gevinson would be joining the cast as Feather, the mistress of Jamie Lee Curtis's character's ex-husband. Philip Casnoff was cast as Cathy's ex-husband on August 9, 2015. Returning recurring characters in this episode are Breezy Eslin as Jennifer "Candle Vlogger", Jim Clock as Detective Chisolm, Elise Fyke as Nurse Fine,
and Judy Durning as a Painter in the asylum.

The episode also featured the song "Beware of Young Girls" by Kate Dimbleby and Naadia Sheriff.

Reception

Ratings
"Beware of Young Girls" was watched live by 2.44 million U.S. viewers and got a 1.0 rating/3 share in the adult 18–49 demographic.

Critical reception
"Beware of Young Girls" received mostly mixed to negative reviews from critics. Patrick Sproull from Den of Geek stated, "overall, the performances remain superlative and the underlying postmodern fun remains infectious - but the script, while not messy per se, was focussed on areas that don't need to be touched on." The A.V. club LaToya Ferguson gave the episode a D, citing "What's worst about "Beware Of Young Girls" is that it's neither aggressively bad nor aggressively good enough to make it even a middle of the road episode. Instead, it's merely a nothing episode." Terri Schwartz from IGN gave the episode 7.4 out of 10. She said that ""Beware of Young Girls" felt too much like a filler episode that was trying to buy more time until Scream Queens needs to resolve the whodunnit mystery."

References

2015 American television episodes
Scream Queens (2015 TV series) episodes
Television episodes written by Ryan Murphy (writer)